Barbara Wilk-Ślizowska (4 February 1935 – 2 February 2023) was a Polish gymnast. She competed at the 1952 Summer Olympics and the 1956 Summer Olympics, winning a bronze medal at the latter.

Wilk died in Kraków on 2 February 2023, at the age of 87.

References

External links

1935 births
2023 deaths
Polish female artistic gymnasts
Olympic gymnasts of Poland
Gymnasts at the 1952 Summer Olympics
Gymnasts at the 1956 Summer Olympics
Sportspeople from Kraków
Olympic medalists in gymnastics
Olympic bronze medalists for Poland
Medalists at the 1956 Summer Olympics